Stoke Heath is a small village, located in the parish of Stoke upon Tern in Shropshire, England.

The village is the location of Stoke Heath Prison, a male juveniles prison and Young Offenders Institution.

It is also the location of Stoke-on-Tern Primary School.

See also
Listed buildings in Stoke upon Tern

References

External links

Villages in Shropshire